Teneriffiidae is a family of mites in the order Trombidiformes. There are at least four genera in Teneriffiidae.

Genera
These four genera belong to the family Teneriffiidae:
 Austroteneriffia Womersley, 1935
 Chulacarus
 Mesoteneriffia Irk, 1939
 Teneriffia Thor, 1911

References

Further reading

External links

 

Trombidiformes
Acari families